Darren Adamson (born 19 May 1994) is an English male badminton player.

Achievements

BWF International Challenge/Series
Men's doubles

 BWF International Challenge tournament
 BWF International Series tournament
 BWF Future Series tournament

References

External links 

 

1994 births
Living people
English male badminton players
Sportspeople from Bedford